Vitalius is a genus of South American tarantulas that was first described by S. Lucas, P. I. da Silva Jr. & Rogério Bertani in 1993.<ref name=Luca1993>{{cite journal| last1=Lucas| first1=S.| last2=Silva Jr.| first2=P. I. da| last3=Bertani| first3=R.| year=1993| title=Vitalius a new genus of the subfamily Theraphosinae Thorell, 1870 from Brazil (Araneae, Theraphosidae)| journal=Spixiana| pages=241–245| volume=16| author-link3=Rogério_Bertani}}</ref>

Diagnosis
They can be distinguished from other tarantulas by the lack of stridulating hairs on the prolateral side of coxa 1 and in the palpal bulb. By the absence of scopula on the side of femur 1, and metatarsus 1 closing between the male spur branches. 

Species
 it contains ten species, found in Argentina and Brazil:Vitalius buecherli Bertani, 2001 – BrazilVitalius dubius (Mello-Leitão, 1923) – BrazilVitalius longisternalis Bertani, 2001 – Brazil, ArgentinaVitalius lucasae Bertani, 2001 – BrazilVitalius nondescriptus (Mello-Leitão, 1926) – BrazilVitalius paranaensis Bertani, 2001 – Brazil, ArgentinaVitalius roseus (Mello-Leitão, 1923) – Brazil, ArgentinaVitalius sorocabae (Mello-Leitão, 1923) (type) – BrazilVitalius vellutinus (Mello-Leitão, 1923) – BrazilVitalius wacketi (Mello-Leitão, 1923) – Brazil

In SynonymyV. cephalopheus (Piza, 1944) = Vitalius vellutinus (Mello-Leitão, 1923)V. cesteri (Mello-Leitão, 1923) = Vitalius dubius (Mello-Leitão, 1923)V. communis (Piza, 1939) = Vitalius dubius (Mello-Leitão, 1923)V. cucullatus (Mello-Leitão, 1923) = Vitalius dubius (Mello-Leitão, 1923)V. exsul (Mello-Leitão, 1923) = Vitalius dubius (Mello-Leitão, 1923)V. insularis (Mello-Leitão, 1923) = Vitalius wacketi (Mello-Leitão, 1923)V. litoralis  = Vitalius wacketi (Mello-Leitão, 1923)V. masculus (Piza, 1939) = Vitalius wacketi (Mello-Leitão, 1923)V. melanocephalus (Mello-Leitão, 1923) = Vitalius sorocabae (Mello-Leitão, 1923)V. melloleitaoi  = Vitalius nondescriptus (Mello-Leitão, 1926)V. mus (Piza, 1944) = Vitalius dubius (Mello-Leitão, 1923)V. piracicabensis (Piza, 1933) = Vitalius dubius (Mello-Leitão, 1923)V. urbanicola (Soares, 1941) = Vitalius dubius (Mello-Leitão, 1923)V. ypiranguensis (Soares, 1941) = Vitalius dubius (Mello-Leitão, 1923)

Nomina dubiaV. platyomma (Mello-Leitão, 1923 - BrazilV. rondoniensis (Mello-Leitão, 1923  - BrazilV. tetracanthus (Mello-Leitão, 1923 -  Brazil

Formerly included 
 Vitalius cristatus (Mello-Leitão, 1923) → Lasiodora cristata Vitalius holophaeus (Mello-Leitão, 1923) → Eupalaestrus spinosissimus Vitalius vulpinus Schmidt, 1998 → Nhandu tripepii''

See also
 List of Theraphosidae species

References

External links

Theraphosidae genera
Spiders of South America
Theraphosidae